Published by Molly Keane in 1981, Good Behaviour tells a story of Irish society in the early twentieth century. Narrated by the daughter of the St. Charles family, Aroon, nothing is as it seems. A cold mother, a gay brother and a similarly inclined love interest all unseen or excused by the society focused upon good behaviour. The book was nominated for the Booker Prize and has been adapted for television and radio (1996).

References

1981 Irish novels
Irish historical novels
Novels set in Ireland